{{DISPLAYTITLE:C6H3N2O5}}
C6H3N2O5−
as a molecular formula can represent any of:
 Dinitrophenolates
 2,3-Dinitrophenolate
 2,4-Dinitrophenolate
 2-Hydroxy-5-nitrophenyl nitrite, anion(1−)

References